Tsen Tou Jilin City is a Chinese Ice Hockey team based in Jilin City, China, where it was founded in 2017. Unlike the majority of teams in the Supreme Hockey League, which are affiliates of Kontinental Hockey League teams, Tsen Tou plays as an independent entity. While no formal link is in place, HC Kunlun Red Star's former manager, Vladimir Krechin, stated that the club plans to work in the future with Tsen Tou. The name of the club takes from the abbreviation of its owner, Jilin City Construction Holding Group, a city-owned enterprise.

References

External links
 Tsen Tou team states on EliteProspects.com

Ice hockey clubs established in 2017
2017 establishments in China
Ice hockey teams in China